The Northern Lake County Conference (NLCC) is an organization of eight high schools in northern Illinois. These high schools are members of the Illinois High School Association.

The conference was established in 2016 with six former members of the North Suburban Conference (Antioch, Grant, Lakes, North Chicago, Round Lake, and Wauconda) and two former members of the Fox Valley Conference (Grayslake Central and Grayslake North).  As the name implies, all members of the conference are located in Lake County.

Membership 
The conference's current members, as of 2021–22:

Membership timeline

State championships 
Seven IHSA State Championships have been earned by members of the NLCC.

Competitive Cheerleading 

 Grayslake Central
 2018-19 M
 Antioch
 2019-20 M

Cross Country (boys) 

 Grayslake Central
 2015-16 2A

Cross Country (girls) 

 Grayslake Central
 2021-22 2A
 2022-23 2A

Track & Field (boys) 

 North Chicago
 1985-86 AA

Wrestling (boys) 

 North Chicago
 1969-70

Notes

References

External links 

 Illinois High School Association, Official Site

High school sports conferences and leagues in the United States
Illinois high school sports conferences
High school sports in Illinois